Lheebroek is a hamlet in the Dutch province of Drenthe.

The hamlet was first mentioned between 1381 and 1383 as to Lederbroke, and means "swampy land belonging to Lhee". Lheebroek was home to 40 people in 1840.

References

Populated places in Drenthe
Westerveld